Volvo V may refer to:
Volvo V40, a car model from the Swedish car manufacturer Volvo
Volvo V50, a car model from the Swedish car manufacturer Volvo
Volvo V60, a car model from the Swedish car manufacturer Volvo
Volvo V70, a car model from the Swedish car manufacturer Volvo
Volvo V90, a car model from the Swedish car manufacturer Volvo